Brembilla may refer to:

 Brembilla, a former commune in the province of Bergamo, in Lombardy, Italy
 Val Brembilla, a comune resulting from the 2014 merger of Brembilla and Gerosa
 Alberto Brembilla, an Italian basketball player
 Emiliano Brembilla, an Italian swimmer
 Pierre Brembilla, a French association football player in the 1930s and 1940s

See also
 Brambilla